Amathia is a genus of bryozoans belonging to the family Vesiculariidae.

The genus has cosmopolitan distribution.

Species

Species:

Amathia acervata 
Amathia aegyptiana 
Amathia aggregata

References

Bryozoan genera